Clemmus is a genus of beetles in the family Anamorphidae. There are at least two described species in Clemmus.

Species
These two species belong to the genus Clemmus:
 Clemmus minor (Crotch, 1873)
 Clemmus troglodytes Hampe, 1850

References

Coccinelloidea genera
Articles created by Qbugbot